Miguel Gallardo may refer to:
 Miguel Gallardo (footballer)
 Miguel Gallardo (singer)
 Miguel Gallardo (comics artist)
 Miguel Gallardo Valles, Mexican tennis player